The Bear Valley Strip Mine is an abandoned coal strip mine located in Coal Township, Northumberland County, to the southwest of the town of Shamokin, Pennsylvania.  It lies in the Western Middle Field of the Anthracite belt in the Ridge-and-Valley Appalachians, where the Pennsylvanian Llewellyn Formation is exposed.  The property is owned by the Reading Anthracite Company.

Structural geology
The coal and other overlying rock has been removed by mining down to a resistant sandstone bed, revealing the three-dimensional structures of folding and faulting caused by the Alleghany Orogeny.  Students of geology have visited the location for decades due to the quality of exposures.

The central anticline in the valley is often called the "Whaleback".

The sequence of structural deformation is outlined as follows:

Gallery

References

Coal mines in the United States
Geography of Northumberland County, Pennsylvania
Mines in Pennsylvania